Football Sunday on ESPN Radio is a weekly radio program dedicated to the National Football League (NFL) every Sunday on ESPN and ESPN Radio. Jonathan Coachman is the show's host and the analysts are former defensive back Eric Allen, former quarterback Tim Hasselbeck, and former wide receiver Tom Waddle. The program broadcasts from ESPN headquarters in Bristol, Connecticut and is sponsored by Vivid Seats.

The host and analysts bring listeners the up-to-the-minute action during the NFL Sunday afternoon games. The program also brings the latest scores every ten minutes with Marc Kestecher on either the Scoreboard Update or ESPN Radio SportsCenter. After the games end, they are also joined by some of the biggest players of the day to talk about their respective game, and get ready for Sunday Night Football and Monday Night Football with guests like John Clayton, Chris Mortensen and Qadry Ismail.

Former hosts of the program include Mike Tirico (1993–96), Trey Wingo (2001–03), Erik Kuselias (2004–05), John Seibel (2006–07), Ryen Russillo (2008–09), Freddie Coleman (2010-12), and Adnan Virk (2011–12).

The series was historically known as the NFL on ESPN Radio until the 2013 season, even though the league never officially endorsed the broadcast.

Play-by-play broadcasts

On May 21, 2013 ESPN Radio announced they would begin syndicating NFL games during the 2013 season. ESPN Radio entered into a contract with the New York Giants, New York Jets, New England Patriots, and Miami Dolphins to syndicate select games out-of-market throughout the year. Play-by-play announcers for the broadcasts include Marc Kestecher, Sean McDonough, Bill Rosinski, and Ryan Ruocco, while analysts include Herm Edwards, Shaun O'Hara, Bill Polian, and Damien Woody. As of the 2022 season, ESPN Radio covers Sunday afternoon NFL games nationally, alongside competing networks Sports USA and Compass Media.

References
Press Release: 2006 NFL SEASON ON ESPN

External links
The NFL on ESPN Radio web page
ESPN Radio official website

ESPN Radio programs
American sports radio programs
ESPN Radio